James J. Archer (July 12, 1860 – May 24, 1921) was an American politician and lawyer. He served in the Maryland Senate from 1914 to 1917.

Early life
James J. Archer was born on July 12, 1860, at Shamrock, Bel Air, Maryland, to Henry W. Archer. His great-grandfather was John Archer. His uncles were James J. Archer and Robert Archer, who both served with the Confederate States Army. Archer studied at Bel Air Academy. Archer studied at Princeton University and graduated from University of Maryland School of Law.

Career
Archer practiced law for thirty years in Harford, Cecil and Baltimore counties.

Archer was a Democrat. Archer was elected in 1913, defeating Walter W. Preston in the primary and C. W. Famous in the general election for Maryland Senate. He served in the senate from 1914 to 1917.

Personal life
Archer did not marry.

Archer died on May 24, 1921 at his home in Shamrock, Bel Air, Maryland. He was buried at the family lot in Green Mount Cemetery in Baltimore.

References

External links

1860 births
1921 deaths
People from Bel Air, Maryland
Princeton University alumni
University of Maryland Francis King Carey School of Law alumni
Democratic Party Maryland state senators
Maryland lawyers